The 2021–22 Slovak First Football League was the 29th season of first-tier football league in Slovakia since its establishment in 1993.

Slovan Bratislava were the defending champions for the third successive year, after picking up the second consecutive domestic double in the previous season. Slovan successfully retained their league title, winning a record-breaking fourth title in a row and 12th overall since the competition was established in 1993.

Teams
Twelve teams competed in the league – the top ten teams from the previous season, the relegation play-offs winner and the one team promoted from the 2. Liga, Tatran Liptovský Mikuláš, who were promoted to the top flight for the first time. Nitra (relegated after four years in the top flight) had been relegated to 3. Liga.

Stadiums and locations

Personnel and kits

Managerial changes

Regular stage

League table

Results
Each team plays home-and-away against every other team in the league, for a total of 22 matches each.

Championship group

Relegation group

Europa Conference League play-offs

Semi-finals

Final

Season statistics

Top goalscorers

1 plus 1 play-off goal 
2 plus 2 play-off goals

Top assists

Hat-tricks

Clean sheets

Discipline

Player

Most yellow cards: 10

  Marin Ljubičić (Sereď)

Most red cards: 2
  Dominik Špiriak (Pohronie)

Club

Most yellow cards: 71
Sereď

Most red cards: 4
Senica
Pohronie
Sereď

Awards

Monthly awards

Annual awards

Team of the Season

Team of the Season was:
Goalkeeper:  Dominik Takáč (Spartak Trnava)
Defenders:  Matej Madleňák (Ružomberok),  Martin Škrtel (Spartak Trnava),  Guram Kashia (Slovan Bratislava),  Lukáš Fabiš (Ružomberok)
Midfielders:   Philip Azango (Trenčín),  Ibrahim Rabiu (Slovan Bratislava),  Jakub Kadák (Trenčín),  Jaba Kankava (Slovan Bratislava),  Vladimír Weiss Jr. (Slovan Bratislava)
Forward:  Martin Regáli (Ružomberok)

Under-21 Team of the Season
Source:
Goalkeeper:   Ivan Krajčírik (Ružomberok)
Defenders:  Alex Méndez (Zemplín Michalovce),  Sebastian Kóša (Spartak Trnava),  Roko Jureškin (Sereď)
Midfielders:  Alexandros Kyziridis (Zlaté Moravce),  Filip Lichý (Slovan Bratislava/Ružomberok),  Matúš Begala (Zemplín Michalovce),  Samuel Lavrinčík (Trenčín),  Jakub Kadák (Trenčín),  Bamidele Yusuf (Spartak Trnava)
Forward:   Tomáš Bobček (Ružomberok)

Individual Awards

Manager of the Season

 Vladimír Weiss (Slovan Bratislava)

Player of the Season

 Vladimír Weiss Jr. (Slovan Bratislava)

Young Player of the Season

 Jakub Kadák (Trenčín)

See also
2021–22 Slovak Cup
2021–22 2. Liga (Slovakia)
2022–23 UEFA Champions League
2022–23 UEFA Europa Conference League
List of Slovak football transfers summer 2021
List of Slovak football transfers winter 2021–22
List of foreign Slovak First League players

Notes

References

External links 
 

Slovak
2021-22
1